Big lift or variation, may refer to:

 The Big Lift, a 1950 black-and-white film
 2015 "Big Lift" project, a project to renovate the Angus L. Macdonald Bridge
 1963 Operation "Big Lift", a U.S. Armed Forces deployment operation to practise war deployment
 , a Dutch shipping company, operator of heavy-lift ships

See also

 Bell Model 214B Big Lifter helicopter
 
 
 
 Lift (disambiguation)
 Big (disambiguation)